The Rio Brazos is a  long river flowing through northern New Mexico in the United States. It rises in the Tusas Mountains, a subrange of the San Juan Mountains, and runs generally southwest to a confluence with the Rio Chama, part of the larger Rio Grande system.

The river is formed by two streams, the  West Fork and the  East Fork, which converge at Brazos Meadows, just outside the western boundary of the Carson National Forest. For its first few miles, it flows south as a slow-moving, meandering mountain stream. Northeast of Tierra Amarilla, the river emerges from the mountains, receiving Chavez Creek from the right.

The Brazos is a perennial stream, reaching its highest flows in April and early May from snowmelt in the mountains, and is subject to occasional flash floods caused by summer thunderstorms. Although most of the river's length provides good fishing for brown and rainbow trout, especially the upper section which is one of the largest high-meadow streams in New Mexico, most of the drainage is private property making it largely inaccessible for recreation.

Although most of the Brazos flows through wild lands, the river is heavily used for irrigation in the last , with multiple acequias (irrigation ditches) drawing off water. As a result, this section of the river often shrinks to a trickle during the dry season. The U.S. Environmental Protection Agency lists the water quality for the last  of the river as "impaired", owing mainly to agricultural runoff and heavy summer water diversions.

See also
List of rivers of New Mexico
List of tributaries of the Rio Grande

References

Rivers of New Mexico
Rivers of Rio Arriba County, New Mexico